Hindson is a surname. Notable people with the surname include:

Alice Hindson (1896–1984), English weaver
Clarrie Hindson (1907–?), Australian rules footballer
Ed Hindson (born 1944), American Christian evangelist
James Hindson (born 1973), English cricketer
Matthew Hindson (born 1968), Australian composer
Phil Hindson, Scottish footballer and manager